The 2003 Asian Artistic Gymnastics Championships were the 2nd edition of the Asian Artistic Gymnastics Championships, and were held in Guangzhou, China from November 22 to November 25, 2003.

Medal summary

Men

Women

Medal table

Participating nations 
69 athletes from 14 nations competed.

 (8)
 (8)
 (3)
 (7)
 (8)
 (1)
 (6)
 (3)
 (4)
 (2)
 (8)
 (2)
 (5)
 (4)

References
 Complete Results

A
Asian Gymnastics Championships
Asian Gymnastics Championships
International gymnastics competitions hosted by China